Nathalia Brigida (born 28 February 1993) is a Brazilian judoka.

She is the bronze medallist of the 2015 Pan American Games in the -48 kg category.

References

External links
 
 

1993 births
Living people
Brazilian female judoka
21st-century Brazilian women
Judoka at the 2015 Pan American Games
Pan American Games bronze medalists for Brazil
Medalists at the 2015 Pan American Games
Pan American Games medalists in judo